Fanny Grattan Guinness born Fanny Emma Fitzgerald writing as Mrs. H. Grattan Guinness (1831 – 3 November 1898) was a British writer, evangelist and trainer of missionaries.

Life
Guinness was born in 1831 in London. She became an orphan after her mother died and her father took his own life. She was taken in by the family's solicitor who in time also took his own life. She set out to teach.

She married Henry Grattan Guinness in October 1860. They had a son named Harry, who was born October 2, 1861 in Toronto, Canada.

Henry was her partner in the missionary work and she was not only responsible for the administration, but she would also preach to audiences of men and women.

In 1868 Guinness and his wife published The Regions Beyond and Illustrated Missionary News, which was edited by Mrs. H. Grattan Guinness. The magazine would give accounts of missions and missionaries including those in Africa and China.

In 1872 Henry, Fanny and their six children were living in the East End of London. They started the East London Missionary Training Institute

Works
 The First Mission on the Congo, 1862
 The wide world and our work in it: or, the story of the East London Institute for Home and Foreign Missions, 1886
 The new world of Central Africa. With a history of the first Christian mission on the Congo, 1890
 Congo recollections, Editted 1890

Legacy
Her daughter, and later author, Mary Geraldine Guinness married Frederick Howard Taylor. She was one of seven children who entered Christian ministry. Dr. Gershom Whitfield Guinness was a medical missionary to China who escaped the Boxer Rebellion and went on to found the first hospital in Henan south of the Yellow River. Her daughter Lucy wrote Across India at the Dawn of the 20th Century, about her hopes of converting the  natives to Christianity.

References 

1831 births
1898 deaths
British magazine editors
Fanny
19th-century Irish businesspeople